Bernardino Campilius was an Italian painter and follower of Lo Spagna at Spoleto. His name was written beneath a fresco of The Virgin adoring the Infant on the Piazza San Gregorio at Spoleto, and bears the date of 1502.

References

Year of birth unknown
Year of death unknown
People from Spoleto
16th-century Italian painters
Italian male painters
Renaissance painters
Umbrian painters